The Oratorio del Santissimo Crocifisso or the Oratory of the Most Holy Crucifix is a building in central Rome, Italy. Located next to the church of San Marcello al Corso, it served as a prayer hall and meeting house for the Archconfraternity of the Most Holy Crucifix (Arciconfraternita del Santissimo Crocifisso in Urbe). It is best known, like the Oratorio del Gonfalone, which shares the same artists, for its Mannerist decorations.

The structure was built by Giacomo Della Porta in 1568, near the church of San Marcello,  for the Confraternity of Crucifix, founded to venerate the Crucifix (crocefisso) from the nearby church. The confraternity was composed of some of the richest men in Rome, including the cardinals Ranuccio and Alessandro Farnese, nephews of the Pope. The theme of the interior decoration is the Triumph of the Cross. It employed Giovanni de' Vecchi, Cesare Nebbia, Niccolò Circignani, and Cristoforo Roncalli.

It was also host of musical concerts, starting in 1639, when the first performances of fifteen musical oratorios [oratories] by Giacomo Carissimi and Emilio de' Cavalieri occurred here.

It was damaged during the end of XVIII century. It was restored in 1821, as documented in an epigraph.

See also
San Marcello al Corso
The Miraculous plague cure of 1522 is attributed to the processioning of the crucifix.

External links

https://web.archive.org/web/20150520075339/http://www.italycyberguide.com/Geography/cities/rome2000/E105b.htm
Page at Rome Art Lover website

Renaissance architecture in Rome
Religious buildings and structures completed in 1568
Roman Catholic churches in Rome
1568 establishments in the Papal States
Crocifisso